St Finian's church is a Church of Ireland (CoI) church building in the village of Newcastle, County Dublin. The core structures of the church, including the west tower and chancel, are dated to the 15th century. These includes a residential tower, attached to the church, in which the priest lived. In the late 15th century, an elaborate window was added on the eastern side. Other structures of the church date from redevelopments and expansion works in the late 18th century.

Newcastle, at the edge of the Pale, was frequently attacked by the Irish striking out from the Wicklow Mountains; by the early 15th century there were six fortified tower-houses in Newcastle, the tower in the church is the only one still remaining in a habitable condition.

The Roman Catholic (RC) church in Newcastle, also dedicated to Saint Finian, was built in 1813. Both churches, RC and CoI, are included on the Record of Protected Structures by South Dublin County Council.

References

External links
 Church of Ireland website - Celbridge Christ Church (Kildrought) parish
 St Finian's Medieval Church

Former Roman Catholic church buildings
Fortified church buildings
Churches in South Dublin (county)
Diocese of Dublin and Glendalough
Church of Ireland church buildings in the Republic of Ireland